Thirunelli Temple  (also Tirunelli) is an ancient temple dedicated to Lord Maha Vishnu on the side of Brahmagiri hill in Kerala, India, near the border with Karnataka state. The temple is at an altitude of about 900m in north Wayanad in a valley surrounded by mountains and beautiful forests. It is 32 km away from Manathavady.

History 
No proper records of the exact dates of establishment of temple exist, though it is beyond dispute, that Thirunelli was once an important town and pilgrim center in the middle of an inaccessible jungle valley surrounded by mountains on four sides . There exists documentary proof that Thirunelli at the time of  Chera king Bhaskara Ravi Varma I (962–1019 CE) was an important town and pilgrim center in South India. In the dense jungles surrounding temple, the ruins of two ancient villages can be found. Noted historian V. R. Parameswaran Pillai in his book Thirunelli Documents states that this temple was once an integral part of the early recorded history of Kerala.

Mention in Puranas and folklore 
The name Thirunelli derives from the nelli, the Tamil/Malayalam word for Indian gooseberry of the Amla tree. Veda vyasa wrote the 18 existing Puranas. The Matsya Purana, Skanda Purana, Narasimha Purana, Padma Purana, and many other Puranas and Hindu texts mention the beautiful Vishnu temple as being built by Lord Brahma, located in the picturesque Sahya valley, deep in the middle of forest of unmatchable beauty, and in these texts, it is referred to as "Sahyamalaka Kshetra." According to tradition, Lord Brahma was traveling round the Universe on his hamsa, when he became attracted by the beauty of the area now known as Brahmagiri Hill. Descending on that spot, Brahma noticed an idol, set in an Amla tree. Brahma recognized the idol as Lord Vishnu Himself and the place as Vaikuntha (Vishnuloka) itself. With the help of the Devas, Brahma installed the idol and called it Sahyamalak Kshetra. At Brahma’s request Vishnu promised that the waters of the area would wash away all sins. (Thus, the spring and river near the temple is called Papanasini: "washes away all sins").

Even today the head priest of the temple leaves a portion of the worship materials in the belief that Lord Brahma Himself will come and perform pooja rites deep in the holy hours of morning.

The famous incarnation of Lord Vishnu Parasurama is reputed to have visited Thirunelli and performed last rites of his father sage Jamadagni. He also took immersion in the Papanasini to wipe away sins committed in killing Kshatriyas.

Relation with other temples and legends 
Kottiyoor Temple and Trisillery temple are inextricably linked with legends and folklore to Thirunelli temple. There exists an old route which traverses Narinirangi Mala to connect with Trissilery Maha Deva Lord Siva temple. In earlier days, all devotees who visited Trissilery used to undertake the arduous crossing of Narinirangi mala to pay respect to Lord Vishnu and Brahma at Thirunelli. The journey was fraught with danger and might have been comparable to hardships of early Sabarimala pilgrimages.

Surroundings

Papanasini stream
Emanating from the heart of Brahmagiri forest flowing through roots, leaves and flowers of ancient trees and medicinal herbs, Papanasini is a holy mountain stream accessible around 1 km northwest of the temple premises. Pilgrims bathe here as they consider its waters to be sacred with powers to absolve one's sins. Further, the temple offers services to immerse cremation ashes in the sacred mountain stream to be thus carried to Kaveri River and from there to the ocean. This is a part of the last rites.

Panchatheertham

Panchatheertham is the holy temple pond. One notable feature of the temple is the lack of a temple well. Hence water is transported from a perennial mountain stream deep in the valley by impressive stone aqueducts right into the priests' room. Thirunelli is famous as the destination to perform last rites of the deceased at the rock close to Papa nasini stream.

Renovation
Parts of the temple including sanctum sanctorum is being renovated. Renovation activities can be seen on one side of the temple where sculpted stones and beautiful wood carvings are under preparation.

Access
The temple lies at an altitude of 3000 feet and can be reached by driving through three wild life sanctuaries. Thirunelli Temple can be accessed from Mananthavady or Kalpetta. The Periya ghat road connects Mananthavady to Kannur and Thalassery.  The Thamarassery mountain road connects Calicut with Kalpetta. The Kuttiady mountain road connects Vatakara with Kalpetta and Mananthavady. The Palchuram mountain road connects Kannur and Iritty with Mananthavady.  The road from Nilambur to Ooty is also connected to Wayanad through the village of Meppadi.  There are KSRTC Buses Connecting Thirunelli Temple one important service is
Vaikom Temple <<>> Thirunelli Temple Limited Stop Fast Passenger, Connecting Piravom - Kolenchery - Perumbavoor - Thrissur - Kozhikode - Mananthawady - kalpetta.

The nearest railway station & airport is at Mysore and the nearest airports are Kozhikode International Airport-120 km, Coimbatore International Airport-242 km, Bengaluru International Airport-290 km, and   Kannur International Airport, 58 km.

See also
 Appapara
 Thirunelly
 Palvelicham
 Valliyoorkkavu

References

Hindu temples in Wayanad district
Vishnu temples
Mananthavady Area
Mahavishnu temples in Kerala